Har Adar is an Israeli settlement organized as a local council in the Seam Zone and the Maccabim sub-region of the West Bank. It is located near Abu Ghosh and the Green Line on Road 425, approximately 15 kilometers west of Jerusalem. Har Adar is ranked high on the Israeli socio-economic scale, at 9/10. Har Adar was initially built adjacent to the Green Line but is now largely located within the West Bank.

The international community considers Israeli settlements in the West Bank illegal under international law, but the Israeli government disputes this.

History

An antiquities site at Har Adar has been turned into a small archaeological park, based on finds from a salvage excavation conducted in 1991 on behalf of the Staff Officer for Archaeology, Judea and Samaria, directed by M. Dadon. A building complex was uncovered, with two strata, dating from the fifth to the mid-first centuries BCE, revealing a fort from the Persian period and a farmhouse from the Hellenistic period. In the Ottoman period a wing was added to the house.
The location of Har Adar was named Radar Hill (Giv'at HaRadar), for the World War II British military installation on top of the hill.  The Local Jewish military thought that the installation was an anti-air radar for the protection of Jerusalem. In fact, it was a relay station, to boost the radio signal. The installation was handed over to the Jordanian Arab Legion on May 10, 1948, prior to the second phase of the 1948 Arab-Israeli War. 23 attempts by the Palmach's Harel Brigade to conquer it failed, although the Jewish force held the position for four days starting May 22, 1948. Being under Jordan rule after the 1949 Armistice Agreements, the area was annexed by Jordan in 1950. It was finally captured in the Six-Day War by the Harel Brigade. A monument for the fallen soldiers of the brigade  with Bible citation from 2 Samuel 1:19 stands at the top of the town.

According to the ARIJ, Israeli authorities expropriated land from three Palestinian West Bank villages for the construction of Har Adar: 
627 dunams from Biddu,
456 dunams from Beit Surik,
36 dunams from Qatanna.

On the morning of 26 September 2017, a Palestinian gunman opened fire at the checkpoint in the separation barrier at the rear of the settlement, killing one Border Police officer and two security guards, while wounding a fourth.

Demographics

In 2009, the population of Har Adar was 99.3% Jewish with 1,700 men and 1,600 women. The age distribution was as follows:

Economy
Har Adar is ranked 9/10 (high) on the Israeli socio-economic scale. According to Business Data Israel (BDI), in 2006 Har Adar had the most stable economy  of all Israeli local councils, along with Kfar Shmaryahu. In 2009, the municipal surplus stood at NIS 187,000.

In 2009, there were 1,471 salaried workers in Har Adar. The average salary for males was NIS 15,987, and 8,882 for women – both higher than the national average. 25.5% salaried workers worked for minimum wage. In addition, there were 143 self-employed workers, with an average income of NIS 12,311.

References

External links
 Har Adar local council web site 

Israeli settlements in the West Bank
Populated places established in 1982
1982 establishments in the Palestinian territories